Edmund Lenihan (born 1950), also known as Eddie Lenihan, is an Irish author, storyteller, lecturer and broadcaster. He is one of the few practising seanchaithe (traditional Irish lore-keepers and tale-spinners) remaining in Ireland. He has been called "one of the greatest of Irish story-tellers" and "a national treasure".

Biography
Lenihan is a native of Brosna, County Kerry, Ireland, but currently resides in Crusheen, County Clare. His college education was at Saint Ita's College in Abbeyfeale, County Limerick and University College in Galway. He is a collector and preservationist of folk tales, recording stories told by older people as passed to them in oral tradition, and then distributing them to a wider audience via print, audio and filmed recordings.

Lenihan is particularly well known for his tales of Irish folk heroes, fairies, fallen angels, and other supernatural beings as recorded in Irish mythology, folklore and oral history. He has also published poetry, stories about historical and legendary women of Ireland, and railroad history. In his role as a cultural preservationist he maintains the largest private collection of folklore in Ireland.

His first local reputation developed as an enthusiastic children's storyteller. But as his international storytelling reputation grew, he has appeared in the film, The Fairy Faith, in a series of programmes on BBC radio, and at numerous high-profile folk festivals.

Conservation activism
In the 2004 reprint of his 2003 book, Meeting the Other Crowd: The Fairy Stories of Hidden Ireland Mr. Lenihan explained his continuing dismay at the rapid loss of Irish cultural heritage and artefacts resulting from industrialisation of rural Ireland. He described his motivation to preserve hill forts, rural dwellings and native plants in the context of general preservation of folkways. He also briefly described how his conservation ethics had come to disagreement with the centralised progressive goals of modernist planners.

This had come to international attention in 1999 when Lenihan had stood up to road builders in County Clare who had wanted to cut down a special whitethorn tree. (The whitethorn is considered in local Irish lore, and Celtic folklore in general, to be sacred to the Aos Sí – the fairy folk of Ireland.) In local tradition, this specific tree was believed to serve as the meeting place for the fairies of Munster whenever they prepared to ride against the fairies of Connacht. His activism and protests had made international headlines, and succeeded in altering the road project to spare the tree.

Mr. Lenihan is not a violent activist. In the 1999 incident he used the tactic of mobilising public awareness by telling the old, traditional stories that mentioned the traditional significance of the tree, as well as the punishments that came to those who harmed the abodes of the fairies.

Lenihan's informants
In his cultural preservation efforts Mr. Lenihan relies heavily on local informants. These individuals are (often elderly) members of the rural community who are steeped in a tradition of oral history.

Jimmy Armstrong
Jimmy Armstrong was born in 1914 in Ballyrougham, the son of a land steward for a Protestant landlord. His stories of the people, places and heroes of County Clare were incorporated into the 1982 book, Long Ago by Shannonside. His importance in Lenihan's estimation was "...remarkable, then equally significant is the fact that one such man's death can deprive an area of a large part of its oral tradition at one blow".

Bibliography

Books
 Lenihan, Edmund. Long Ago by Shannonside (1982) Mercier Press. Cork; Dublin. 
 Lenihan, Edmund. A Loss of Face and Other Poems (1983) Inchicronan Press. Crusheen, Co. Clare. OCLC: 17518025
 Lenihan, Edmund. The Portrait Gatherer (1984) Inchicronan Press. Crusheen, Co. Clare. 
 Lenihan, Edmund. Even Iron Men Die (1985) Inchicronan Press. Crusheen, Co. Clare. OCLC: 33124197
 Lenihan, Edmund; Frances Boland. Stories of Old Ireland for Children (1986) (republished 1997) Mercier Press. Cork. 
 Lenihan, Edmund; Joseph Gervin. Strange Irish Tales for Children (1987) (republished 1992) Mercer Press. Cork. 
 Lenihan, Edmund. In Search of Biddy Early (1987) Learning Links.  
 Lenihan, Edmund. In the Tracks of the West Clare Railway (1990) Mercier Press. Cork; Dublin. (republished 1991) Irish American Book Co. 
 Lenihan, Edmund. Ferocious Irish Women (1991) Mercier Press. Dublin.  (Republished in 1997 as Defiant Irish Women )
 Lenihan, Edmund. The Devil Is an Irishman (1995) Mercier Press. 
Lenihan, Edmund. A Spooky Irish Tale for Children (1996) Mercier Press. Dublin. 
 Lenihan, Edmund; Athena Alchazidu. Neuvěřitelná irská dobrodružství (1991) Ando. Brno.  (Czech language)
 Lenihan, Edmund. Gruesome Irish Tales (1997) Mercier Press. Cork. 
 Lenihan, Edmund. Humorous Irish tales for children (1998) Mercier Press. Cork; Dublin. 
 Lenihan, Edmund. Wad of Notes (1998) Gem and Emerald Books. 
 Lenihan, Edmund. The Savage Pigs of Tulla (2000) Mercier Press. Cork; Dublin 
 Lenihan, Edmund. Rowdy Irish Tales for Children(2001) Mercier Press. Cork; Dublin. 
 Lenihan, Eddie; Carolyn Eve Green. Meeting the Other Crowd: The Fairy Stories of Hidden Ireland (2003) Gill & Macmillan. Dublin.  (Republished 2004) Jeremy P. Tarcher/Putnam. New York. (Penguin edition) 
 Lenihan, Edmund; Alan Clarke, Irish Tales of Mystery and Imagination (2006) Mercier Press. Cork; Dublin.  (title as listed by Worldcat)
 Lenihan, Eddie; Alan Clarke. Irish Tales of Mystery and Magic (2006) Mercier Press. Cork; Dublin.  (title as listed by Amazon.com)

Media
 Lenihan, Edmund. Fionn MacCumhail and the Dark Pool (1983) Ceirnini Cladaig. Baile Atha Cliath, Éire.  (Cassette Tape)
 Lenihan, Edmund. Niamh and the Giant (1984) Claddagh Records. Dublin. OCLC: 39034369 (Cassette tape)
 Lenihan, Edmund. Story Teller. (1986) Claddagh Records. Dublin. OCLC: 64861824 (Cassette Tape)
 Lenihan, Edmund Storyteller 2 (1988) Claddagh Records. Dublin. OCLC: 39034419 (Cassette tape)
 Aziz, Peter; Elizabeth Jane Baldry; Neil Boyle (II); and Hugh Boyle (III). The Fairy Faith (2001) Wellspring Media. ASIN: B00005K9OQ (Documentary DVD)
 Lenihan, Edmund; Colcannon (Musical group); Windhorse Productions. The Good People (2001) Sounds True. Boulder. OCLC: 47106057 (Cassette Tape)
 Lenihan, Edmund; "Tell Me a Story Podcast" (2020) Produced by Philip Murphy & John Lillis.

See also

Traditional knowledge
Alan Lomax (folk music archivist)
Brothers Grimm (folklore conservators)

References

External links

 Eddie Lenihan – Seanchaí – Storyteller – Author's website
 
 "Festival Thru The Lens" – Photos and report of Lenihan's appearance at the Killala Festival 2003, Castlebar, Ireland
 Photos of Lenihan performing for schoolchildren
 Photos from Round Stone Summerfest 2007

Irish children's writers
Irish folklorists
Irish poets
People from County Kerry
1950 births
Living people
Claddagh Records artists